Robert Podoliński (born 8 October 1975) is a Polish football manager and sports commentator.

References

1975 births
Living people
Polish football managers
Ząbkovia Ząbki managers
MKS Cracovia managers
Podbeskidzie Bielsko-Biała managers
Radomiak Radom managers
Ekstraklasa managers
I liga managers
II liga managers